The General Chiropractic Council (GCC) is an independent statutory body established by Parliament to regulate the chiropractic profession in the United Kingdom. It protects the health and safety of the public by ensuring high standards of practice in the chiropractic profession.

It was established by the Chiropractors Act 1994 to protect the public by regulating chiropractors, set standards for professional education, practice and conduct and to ensure the development of the chiropractic profession.

The GCC is one of nine health and social care regulators in the UK that are regulated by the Professional Standards Authority for Health and Social Care.

The General Chiropractic Council provides a searchable database of registered chiropractors.

Organisation
The GCC is led by a council that is responsible for ensuring the GCC carries out its core functions. The General Council is formed of seven non-chiropractors and seven chiropractors and meets six times a year. Each member serves for 3 or 4 years. The GCC has four Statutory Committees which support the work of the Council. They are:
The Education Committee
The Investigating Committee
The Health Committee
The Professional Conduct Committee
The GCC is also supported by two non-statutory Committees. They are:
 Audit Committee
 Remuneration Committee
The GCC may also set up short-term Working Groups as required.

Other UK healthcare regulators 

The Professional Standards Authority for Health and Social Care (PSA) is an independent body accountable to the UK Parliament which promotes the health and wellbeing of the public and oversees the nine UK healthcare regulators. These are:

 General Medical Council 
 Nursing and Midwifery Council
 General Dental Council
 General Pharmaceutical Council
 General Optical Council
 Health and Care Professions Council
 General Osteopathic Council
 Pharmaceutical Society of Northern Ireland

References

External links
 Official website 
 Doctor search

Health in the London Borough of Camden
Medical regulation in the United Kingdom
Organisations based in the London Borough of Camden
Professional associations based in the United Kingdom
Chiropractic organizations
Medical and health regulators
Regulators of the United Kingdom
1994 establishments in the United Kingdom
Organizations established in 1994